Chuckie is a name that is commonly used as a nickname or stagename. Notable people who are referred to by this name include the following.

Nickname
Chuckie Dreyfus nickname of Charles de Joya Dreyfus (born 1974), Filipino actor born
Chuckie Fick, nickname of Charles Joseph Fick who is known as C. J. Fick (born 1985), American baseball player
Chuckie Keeton, nickname of Charles Adam Keeton IV (born 1993), American football player and coach
Chuckie Merlino, nickname of Salvatore Merlino (1939–2012), American mobster
Chuckie Miller, nickname of Charles Elliot Miller (born 1965), American football player
Chuckie O'Brien, nickname of Charles O'Brien, longtime friend of Jimmy Hoffa, suspected of involvement in Hoffa's disappearance
Chuckie Taylor, nickname of Charles McArther Emmanuel (born 1978), American-born Liberian politician and criminal
Chuckie Typewriter, nickname of Charles Nicoletti (1916 - 1977), American mob hitman
Chuckie Williams, nickname of Charles Leon Williams (born 1953), American basketball player

Stage name
Chuckie (DJ) or DJ Chuckie, stage name of Clyde Sergio Narain (born 1978), Surinamese DJ
Chuckie Akenz (born 1986), nickname of Vietnamese-Canadian rapper whose stagename is C-A and birthname is Chuckie Nguyen
Chuckie Campbell, stage name of Charles Edward Campbell (born 1981), American musician
Chuckie T., a ringname of Chuck Taylor (wrestler) (born 1986), American wrestler, who was born Dustin Lee Howard

Fictional characters
Chuckie Finster, Rugrats and All Grown Up! character
Chuckie Slott, a recurring character on Shameless
Chuckie, a dog in the 1983 video game Chase the Chuck Wagon

See also

Chickie (nickname)
Chuckii Booker
Chucky (disambiguation)
Chuckey Charles

Lists of people by nickname